Samuel Finkelstein (1895–1942) was a Jewish oil painter in the interwar Poland who died at the Nazi death camp Treblinka during the Holocaust.

Biography
Finkelstein was born in Sandomierz, in the Radom Governorate of Congress Poland. He first graduated from a trade school, but became dissatisfied with the trades and started painting. His friends and family suggested he take art classes, and in 1913–1914, he enrolled at the Kraków Academy of Fine Arts where he studied under Wojciech Weiss of the Young Poland movement. After World War I, he settled in Łódź, where he exhibited steadily and became active in the arts of the city.

He became a member of the “Start” Painters Association, and the City of Łódź Artists’ Association. He also traveled regularly to various art colony areas and the artists’ village of Kazimierz Dolny. He became active in the Kraków art scene by joining the Jednoróg Artists Guild – a group of graduates of Kraków Academy – and exhibiting with them. He also participated in the activities of the Jewish community and painted scenes of daily life. He was included in “The World Evoked” exhibition of Jewish culture organized by the Nowy Sącz District Museum.

Although he was affiliated in his own city with the Constructivist Avant Garde and was friendly with such artists as Władysław Strzemiński, Kataryna Kobro and Karol Hiller, his paintings bore the impressionist traditional style in their motifs, colors and his brush-work. When Finkelstein traveled to Kazimierz Dolny, he painted the Jewish life outdoors as he saw it. Chaim Goldberg, an artist born in Kazimierz, recalled the artist as he stood by himself in a field painting.

Samuel Finkelstein died in 1942 during the Holocaust at Treblinka, a Nazi extermination camp.

References

External links

 Towarzystwo Przyjaciół Sztuk Pięknych w Krakowie (Art in Crakow) listing, 1932-34
 Jewish painters in the art colony of Kazimierz Dolny by Dr. Waldemar Odorowski (Author and Editor), published by Muzeum Nadwislanskie, Kazimierz Dolny, Poland 2008
 ArtNet gallery sale
 AskArt listing
 PishPoshPaints, Artist's paintings list
 Finkelstein's works in Central Jewish Library

1895 births
1942 deaths
People from Sandomierz
People from Radom Governorate
Polish Jews who died in the Holocaust
20th-century Polish painters
20th-century Polish male artists
Jewish painters
Polish people who died in Treblinka extermination camp
Polish male painters